Nadine Brandl (born 11 March 1990) is an Austrian synchronized swimmer.

Nadine competed in the women's duet at both the 2008 (with Lisbeth Mahn) and 2012 Summer Olympics (with Livia Lang) finishing in 22nd and 19th place respectively.  Several other members of her family have represented Austria at the Olympics in aquatic events (Alexandra Worisch, Michael Worisch, Franz Worisch and Eva Pfarrhofer).

References 

1990 births
Living people
Austrian synchronized swimmers
Olympic synchronized swimmers of Austria
Synchronized swimmers at the 2008 Summer Olympics
Synchronized swimmers at the 2012 Summer Olympics
Synchronized swimmers at the 2015 World Aquatics Championships
Synchronized swimmers at the 2013 World Aquatics Championships
Synchronized swimmers at the 2011 World Aquatics Championships
Synchronized swimmers at the 2009 World Aquatics Championships
Synchronized swimmers at the 2007 World Aquatics Championships
20th-century Austrian women
21st-century Austrian women